767 Naval Air Squadron (767 NAS) was a Naval Air Squadron of the Royal Navy's Fleet Air Arm. It was initially formed as a Deck Landing Squadron in 1939, when 811 Naval Air Squadron was renumbered 767 NAS, at RNAS Donibristle. A detachment went to Hyeres de la Palyvestre in the south of France, enabling training in fairer conditions. While here, the squadron took on an operational mission, with a bombing attack on the Italian port of Genoa. With the fall of France the squadron evacuated to Algeria, where it split. Part went to Malta, forming 830 Naval Air Squadron, the other part to HMS Ark Royal, with personnel returning to the UK via Gibraltar. The squadron regrouped at RNAS Arbroath and moved to the Deck Landing School at RNAS East Haven in 1943.

1946 saw the squadron move to RNAS Lossiemouth, where it provided its training, operating out of the satellite airfield at RNAS Milltown. It then moved to RNAS Yeovilton three years later, in 1949, where it’s role became Deck Landing Control Officer training. It continued in this role, moving on to RNAS Henstridge in 1952. Later the same year it moved to RNAS Stretton and a change in technology, the introduction of an optical landing system, meant a change in role to a Landing Signal Officers Training Squadron, eventually disbanding in 1955.

It reformed in 1956 as a Fighter Pilot Pool squadron at RNAS Ford, moving to RNAS Brawdy later in the year. However, a month later it was back at Ford but disbanded in April 1957. 767 NAS was next reformed in 1969, as the Operational Conversion Unit (OCU) for the McDonnell Douglas F-4K Phantom II FG.1, operating from RNAS Yeovilton. When this task completed it was then disbanded again in 1972.

History of 767 NAS

Deck Landing Training Squadron (1939 - 1949) 

It was initially equipped with DH.60 Moth, Swordfish and Shark aircraft. Basic training was carried out at Donibristle, however, advanced training was carried out on the aircraft carrier, the modified , HMS Furious.

The squadron sent a detachment to Hyeres de la Palyvestre, a French Naval air station located near Toulon, in Provence, France, in November 1939, to enable shore based training in the more favourable Mediterranean weather conditions. Here, the unique HMS Argus, the Royal Navy aircraft carrier, that was converted from an ocean liner, served as a training ship for carrier deck-landing training.

On the 13 June 1940, the squadron was involved in a bombing raid over the Italian port city of Genoa, just days after Italy entered World War II. This action involved nine aircraft from 767 NAS. Due to poor moonlight on the night, the attempt was abandoned, however, the following night of the 14 June, a successful attack was made. 

With the French falling to the German invasion, the squadron needed to be evacuated from France. Eighteen aircraft flew to Bône in Algeria, using Bône Airfield. Here the squadron separated into two parts, with twelve aircraft going to Hal Far, on the island of Malta, which then formed 830 Naval Air Squadron, in July 1940. The other six going on to the Royal Navy aircraft carrier HMS Ark Royal, with the aircraft being absorbed into it’s squadrons, and 767 NAS personnel going to the UK via Gibraltar.

767 Naval Air Squadron regrouped at RNAS Arbroath (HMS Condor), located near Arbroath in East Angus, Scotland, on the 8 July 1940, continuing as a Deck Landing Training Squadron, now as part of the Deck Landing Training (DLT) School. It was initially equipped with Albacore and Swordfish biplane torpedo bomber aircraft. In September 1940, the squadron received Fulmar, carrier-borne, reconnaissance / fighter aircraft, these remained around one year before being withdrawn in the following October, in 1941. It also operated Proctor radio trainer and communications aircraft, between June and August of that year, then in the November, it received Martlet, a United States carrier-based fighter aircraft, however, these were withdrawn from use in 1942.

East Haven was home to the Deck Landing Training School and Deck Landing Control Officer Training School. 767 NAS was joined by 768 Deck Landing Training Squadron, in October 1943 and 731 Deck Landing Control Officer Training Squadron, in December 1943. Around this time the squadron received a later variant of Fulmar aircraft and the Albacore were withdrawn. However, in 1944, the Fulmar were withdrawn from use and these were replaced with Barracuda carrier-borne torpedo and dive bomber aircraft. The remaining Swordfish aircraft were also withdrawn during 1944. The next year saw the arrival of Firefly aircraft to the squadron. Seafire aircraft were received in early 1946.

Deck Landing Control Officer Training Squadron (1949 - 1953) 

Here it provided Deck Landing Control Officer training and being administered as part of the 50th Training Air Group.

The aircraft flew continuous circuits and approaches to land on whichever runway was in use, enabling the prospective DLCOs to direct their approach. The runway in use was known as the 'Dummy Deck', the trainee DLCOs were known as 'Batsmen' and the repetitive work earned them the nickname ‘Clockwork Mice’. The training course ended with the trainees operating on whichever aircraft carrier was assigned as a Deck Landing Training (DLT) Carrier.

Here the Sea Fury fighter aircraft and Firefly carrier-borne fighter aircraft and anti-submarine aircraft, were the main aircraft used. 767 NAS only remained at Henstridge for a further eight months, before moving, on the 20 September 1952, to RNAS Stretton (HMS Blackcap), an airfield at Appleton Thorn in Cheshire, situated  South East of Warrington.

Landing Signal Officers Training Squadron (1953 - 1955) 

In 1953 the squadron received Attacker, a single-seat naval jet fighter aircraft, and in the October of that year, with the introduction of the Mirror Landing Aid, used to give glidepath information to pilots in the terminal phase of landing on an aircraft carrier, 767 NAS became the Landing Signal Officers Training Squadron. In 1954, the squadron disbanded on the 15 May, but it then reformed on the 20 September and was equipped with Avenger torpedo bomber and Sea Hawk single-seat jet day fighter, aircraft. 767 NAS remained at Stretton for a further six months, however, on the 31 March 1955 the squadron disbanded.

Fighter Pilot Pool (1956 - 1957) 

767 Naval Air Squadron reformed on the 1 March 1956, as a Fighter Pilot Pool squadron, at RNAS Ford (HMS Perigrine), located at Ford, in West Sussex, England. The squadron was equipped with later variants than previously operated at Stretton, of Sea Hawk day fighter aircraft. Here the squadron provided an armament work-up course. However, the following month, on the 20 September, the squadron returned to Ford. Now the squadron was required to train up replacement pilots, needed for FAA squadrons operating in the Suez. 767 Naval Air Squadron disbanded into 764 Naval Air Squadron on the 1 April 1957.

Operational Conversion Unit (1969 - 1972) 

767 Naval Air Squadron reformed on the 14 January 1969, at RNAS Yeovilton (HMS Heron), sited a few miles north of Yeovil, in Somerset, England, as an Operational Conversion Unit (OCU), from the core of 700P Naval Air Squadron. It's role was to convert Royal Navy Fleet Air Arm aircrew and Royal Air Force aircrew, to the Phantom FG.1, an American tandem two-seat, twin-engine, all-weather, long-range supersonic jet interceptor and fighter-bomber aircraft, purchased for the Royal Navy, as a carrier-borne fighter for Fleet defence, to replace the Sea Vixen aircraft. 767 Naval Air Squadron disbanded as an OCU at Yeovilton, once it's task was completed, on the 1 August 1972.

Aircraft flown 

767 Naval Air Squadron has flown a number of different aircraft types, including:

Blackburn Shark Mk III (May 1939 - Jul 1939)
de Havilland DH.60M Moth (Metal Moth) (May 1939 - Jul 1940)
Fairey Swordfish I (May 1939 - Jul 1944)
Blackburn Shark Mk I (Jun 1939 - Jul 1939)
de Havilland DH.60X Moth (Dec 1939 - Jul 1940)
Fairey Albacore (Feb 1940 - Dec 1943)
Fairey Fulmar Mk.I (Sep 1940 - Oct 1941)
Percival P.28 Proctor IA (Apr 1940, Jun 1941 - Aug 1941)
Grumman Martlet Mk I (Nov 1941 - 1942)
Fairey Swordfish II (Jan 1943 - May 1944)
Fairey Fulmar Mk.II (Nov 1943 - Feb 1944)
Fairey Barracuda Mk II (May 1944 - Jul 1946)
Fairey Barracuda Mk I (Jun 1944 - Aug 1946)
Fairey Firefly FR.I (Sep 1945 - Mar 1953)
Supermarine Seafire L Mk III (Mar 1946 - Jun 1947)
Supermarine Seafire F Mk XV (May 1946 - Feb 1952)
Fairey Firefly T.Mk 1 (Apr 1948 - Jun 1953)
North American Harvard III (Aug 1948 - Jul 1950)
North American Harvard IIB (Mar 1949 - Jul 1950)
Fairey Firefly FR.Mk 4 (Oct 1949 - May 1954)
Hawker Sea Fury FB.11 (Nov 1949 - Jun 1952)
de Havilland Dominie (Mar 1950 - Jan 1951)
Supermarine Seafire F Mk 46 (Mar 1950 - Jul 1950)
Fairey Firefly AS.Mk 6 (Mar 1951 - Dec 1951)
Hawker Sea Fury F.10 (Mar 1951 - Jun 1953)
Gloster Meteor T.7 (Feb 1953 - Dec 1953)
Supermarine Attacker F.1 (Feb 1953 - Mar 1954)
Supermarine Attacker FB.2 (Jul 1953 - Mar 1954)
Grumman Avenger AS4 (Sep 1954 - Mar 1955)
Hawker Sea Hawk F1 (Sep 1954 - Mar 1955)
Hawker Sea Hawk F2 (Mar 1956 - May 1957)
Hawker Sea Hawk FB 3 (Mar 1956 - Jun 1957)
McDonnell Douglas F-4K Phantom II FG.1 (Jan 1969 - Jul 1972)

Battle honours 

The battle honours awarded to 767 Naval Air Squadron are:
Mediterreanean 1940

Naval Air Stations and Aircraft Carriers  

767 Naval Air Squadron operated from a number of naval air stations of the Royal Navy, both in the UK and overseas, a number of Royal Navy aircraft carriers and other air bases:
Royal Naval Air Station DONIBRISTLE (May 1939 - November 1939)
HMS Furious - Carrier DLT (June to July 1939, September to October 1939)
Hyeres de la Palyvestre (November 1939 - June 1940)
HMS Argus - Carrier DLT (November 1939)
Bône Airfield (June 1940)
R. N. Air Section HAL FAR at RAF Hal Far - twelve aircraft which formed 830 NAS (June 1940)
HMS Ark Royal - six aircraft (June 1940)
Gibraltar (June 1940)
Royal Naval Air Station ARBROATH (July 1940 - May 1943)
Royal Naval Air Station EAST HAVEN (May 1943 - July 1946)
Royal Naval Air Station MILLTOWN (July 1946 - September 1949)
Royal Naval Air Station YEOVILTON (September 1949 - January 1952)
Royal Naval Air Station HENSTRIDGE (January 1952 - September 1952)
Royal Naval Air Station STRETTON (September 1952 - May 1954)
Royal Naval Air Station STRETTON (September 1954 - March 1955)
Royal Naval Air Station FORD (March 1956 - August 1956)
Royal Naval Air Station BRAWDY (August 1956 - September 1956)
Royal Naval Air Station FORD (September 1956 - April 1957)
Royal Naval Air Station YEOVILTON (January 1969 - August 1972)

Commanding Officers 

List of commanding officers of 767 Naval Air Squadron with month and year of appointment and end:

1939 - 1940
Lt-Cdr E.O.F. Price, RN (May 1939-Aug 1939)
Lt-Cdr J.A.L. Drummond, RN (Aug 1939-Jul 1940)

1940 - 1954
Lt-Cdr P.L. Mortimer, RN (Jul 1940)
Lt-Cdr J.A.L. Drummond, RN (Jul 1940-Nov 1941)
Lt A.G. Leatham, RN (Nov 1941-Jun 1942)
Lt R.L. Williamson, DSC, RN (Jun 1942-July 1942)
Lt R.S. Baker-Faulkner, RN (Jul 1942-Oct 1942)
Lt C.H.C. O’Rourke, RN (Oct 1942-Mar 1943)
Lt-Cdr W.J. Mainprice, RN (Mar 1943-Nov 1943)
Lt-Cdr (A) T.T. Miller, RN (Nov 1943)
Lt-Cdr (A) J.L. Fisher, RNVR (Nov 1943-May 1944)
Lt-Cdr (A) B.W. Vigrass, RNVR (May 1944-Feb 1945)
Lt-Cdr (A) D.R. Park, RNZNVR (Feb 1945-Aug 1945)
Lt-Cdr (A) S.G. Cooke, RN (Aug 1945-Dec 1945)
Lt (A) D.C. Hill, MBE, RNZNVR (Dec 1945-Jan 1946)
Lt-Cdr (A) F.A. Swanton, DSC, RN (Jan 1946-Aug 1946)
Lt J.C.S. Wright, RN (Aug 1946-Nov 1946)
Lt-Cdr L.D. Empson, RN (Nov 1946-Jan 1947)
Lt-Cdr F.A. Swanton, DSC, RN (Jan 1947-Jan 1949)
Lt J.S. Toner, RN (Jan 1949-Apr 1949)
Lt P.H. Mogridge, DSC, RN (Apr 1949-Nov 1949)
Lt W.E. Simpson, DSC, RN (Nov 1949-Apr 1950)
Lt-Cdr C.K. Roberts, RN (Apr 1950-Jun 1951)
Lt M.E. Stanley, RN (Jun 1951-Sep 1951)
Lt-Cdr D.O’D. Newbery, RN (Sep 1951-Nov 1953)
Lt-Cdr L.J. Baker, RN (Nov 1953-May 1954)

1954 - 1955
Lt-Cdr L.J. Baker, RN (Sep 1954-Jan 1955)
Lt B.T. Jones, RN (Jan 1955-Mar 1955)

1956 - 1957
Lt-Cdr G.B. Newby, AFC, RN (Mar 1956-Apr 1957)

1969 - 1972
Lt-Cdr P.C. Marshall, AFC, RN (Jan 1969-Jun 1970)
Lt-Cdr D.A. Borrowman, RN (Jun 1970-Jun 1971)
Lt-Cdr M.J. Doust, RN (Jun 1971-Aug 1972)

References

Citations

Bibliography 
 

700 series Fleet Air Arm squadrons
Military units and formations established in 1939
Military units and formations of the Royal Navy in World War II